Tactusa artus is a moth of the family Erebidae first described by Michael Fibiger in 2010. It is known from north-western Thailand.

The wingspan is about 12 mm. The forewing is long and narrow. The ground colour is yellowish, with a basal-costal patch and a dorso-medial triangular patch. It is yellowish between the basal and the antemedial lines. All subterminal and terminal areas, except for four small beige costal dots, are blackish brown, including the fringes. The subterminal and terminal lines are beige. The hindwing is whitish grey, with an indistinct discal spot and the underside is unicolorous grey.

References

Micronoctuini
Taxa named by Michael Fibiger
Moths described in 2010